Volodymyr Lutsenko is a Ukrainian retired footballer.

Career
Volodymyr Lutsenko started playing in 1997 at Podillya Khmelnytskyi. In 1999, the Ukrainian coach Vladimir Strizhevsky, who previously worked in the Khmelnytsky team, headed the Petropavlovsk "Access-Esil" and invited Lutsenko to Kazakhstan. In the same year, with this team, the Ukrainians won silver medals in the championship. The following year, the footballer returned to Podillya Khmelnytskyi, and then in transit through Nyva Vinnytsia moved to Volyn Lutsk. In the first season with Lutsenko, the Lutsk team were ninth in the first league, and the next season they won the tournament hard.

On July 7, 2002, in the game against Dnipro, Vladimir made his debut in the top league, and in total, Lutsenko played 8 matches in the top division of Ukraine. Since 2003, he has played in the teams of the lower divisions: Boreks Borodianka, Mykolaiv, Desna Chernihiv, Krystal Kherson, Krystal Kherson.

References

External links 
 Volodymyr Lutsenko footballfacts.ru 
 Volodymyr Lutsenko allplayers.in.ua 

1972 births
Living people
FC Desna Chernihiv players
Ukrainian footballers
Ukrainian Premier League players
Ukrainian First League players
Ukrainian Second League players
Ukrainian expatriate sportspeople in Kazakhstan
Expatriate footballers in Kazakhstan
Association football defenders